Paeon or Paion (Ancient Greek: Παίων, gen.: Παίονος), in Greek mythology, was an Elean prince as son of King Endymion, and brother of Epeius, Aetolus, Eurycyda and possibly Naxos. From him the district of Paeonia, on the Axius river in Macedonia, was believed to have derived its name.

Notes

References
 Pausanias, Description of Greece with an English Translation by W.H.S. Jones, Litt.D., and H.A. Ormerod, M.A., in 4 Volumes. Cambridge, MA, Harvard University Press; London, William Heinemann Ltd. 1918. . Online version at the Perseus Digital Library
Pausanias, Graeciae Descriptio. 3 vols. Leipzig, Teubner. 1903.  Greek text available at the Perseus Digital Library.
Smith, William, A dictionary of Greek and Roman biography and mythology. London. Online at Perseus
Stephanus of Byzantium, Stephani Byzantii Ethnicorum quae supersunt, edited by August Meineike (1790-1870), published 1849. A few entries from this important ancient handbook of place names have been translated by Brady Kiesling. Online version at the Topos Text Project.

Family of Calyce
Paeonian mythology
Ancient Eleans
Elean mythology
Princes in Greek mythology